Nandrolone hexyloxyphenylpropionate (NHPP; brand names Anador, Anadur, Anadurine), also known as 19-nortestosterone 17β-(3-(4-hexyloxy)phenyl)propionate, is a synthetic androgen and anabolic steroid and a nandrolone ester that is marketed in France, Denmark, Austria, Luxembourg, and Turkey. It has been studied as a potential long-acting injectable male contraceptive, though it has not been marketed for this indication. Approximately 70% of men became azoospermic, while the remaining men all became oligospermic. NHPP has a mean residence time in the body of 29.1 days and an elimination half-life in the body of 20.1 days.

See also
 List of androgen esters § Nandrolone esters

References

Androgens and anabolic steroids
Contraception for males
Nandrolone esters
Progestogens
Carboxylate esters